This is a list of time capsules. The register of The International Time Capsule Society estimates there are between 10,000 and 15,000 time capsules worldwide. An active list of Time Capsules is maintained by the NotForgotten Digital Preservation Library.

By country

Australia

Historical 
On 29 September 1896, when the Perth Observatory foundation was laid, the occasion was attended by Sir John Forrest and other notable dignitaries. Several items of importance were placed in a 'leaden box', sealed and deposited in a cavity beneath the foundation stone. The local press reported the event and mentioned here since "Röntgen rays tubes, and a description of the process, together with specimen photographs", donated by X-ray pioneer William John Hancock were included in the cache.
This is the first known instance of a time capsule in Western Australia, and in Australia.

Also in Western Australia, in celebration of the laying of the foundation stone of the Northam Railway Institute on 28 July 1897, laid by Mrs. Ann Throssell, the wife of the Commissioner of Crown Lands and local MP George Throssell, a bottle containing two copies of the Northam Advertiser newspaper and several coins was laid in a cavity beneath the foundation stone.

Contemporary 

In celebration of its golden jubilee, Epping Boys High School of Sydney buried a time capsule in the foyer of its library, in 2007, to be unearthed in the centenary year. A previous time capsule was buried in 1982 to celebrate the silver jubilee.  The town of Cowra in central Western New South Wales contained a time capsule which was buried near a sculpture of an eagle in the park not far from the town's information center. The capsule was opened in the year 2000 on an unspecified date, although the sculpture remains, there is no mention of the time capsule once buried there.

A time capsule is also located at Nailsworth Primary School in South Australia, being planted in 2001 to be opened in 2025, this capsule was planted to replace the 1977 capsule opened the same year. A time capsule is also present on the grounds of Melbourne High school in Victoria.

A time capsule on Canberra's City Hill was unveiled on 11 March 2013 to commemorate the city's centenary. It is to be unsealed in 2113.

On 22 February 2018, the Sunshine Coast Council concluded its celebration of the 50th Anniversary of the Naming of the Sunshine Coast by burying a historic time capsule. The capsule contains a number of reports, documents, and objects from the year previous, and a letter from Mayor Mark Jamieson and 2017 Young Citizen of the Year, Jak Hardy, who was appointed its guardian through to 2067.

Austria
 Memory of Mankind in Hallstatt.

Bermuda 
In celebration of its 150th corporate anniversary, Bacardi Limited installed a 1.82m x 0.30m stainless steel time capsule, encased in a granite cap and cement pedestal, in front of the Bacardi worldwide headquarters in Bermuda. The capsule was placed in December 2012 and is intended to be opened in 2062, at the company's 200th anniversary.

Brazil 
In Brazil, many institutions have created, independently, their own time capsules, some of which have already been opened for celebrations or historical research purposes:

 In April 3rd 1922, a metal box was buried on a yard of the 3rd Anti-Air Artillery Group (3º GAAAe), in Caxias do Sul/RS. The time capsule, containing historical documents such as old newspapers, official Army reports and coins, was restored by the Universidade de Caxias do Sul (UCS) and given back to the Brazilian Army. The existence and location of the box was discovered 100 years after the burial, when Corpoal Glauber Tiago Dal Paz found a reference to it in a book. He was doing a research on the artillery unit's history for the centenary celebrations.
 In celebration of their 50th anniversary in 1969, the "Movimento dos Bandeirantes" prepared a 1m high bronze cylinder inside, containing objects, documents, messages and many other information about the Bandeirantes of the time. It was buried inside a granite monument, in front of their headquarters. The time capsule was opened on Aug 13th 2019, during a ceremony with more than 1,000 people from all regions of the country, who came to Rio de Janeiro to celebrate the 100th anniversary of this youth focused movement.
 In 1972, in celebration of the 150 years of the Independence of Brazil, a time capsule was installed at the National Museum of Brazil to be opened in 2022.   
 On May 30, 2013, a group of students of the Colégio Setor Leste, in Brasília/DF, built a time capsule to keep writings of dreams and wishes of employees and alumni of the school, during its 50th anniversary. The box is supposed to be opened 35 years later, in 2048.
 During the preparations for the 2016 Olympics, a time capsule was unearthed in a construction site, at Rio de Janeiro's docking area. It contained letters from the Brazilian Empire's time.
 Another time capsule, with documents from the Brazilian Empire's period, was found in Alcântara/MA. It contained letters from local nobles regarding the Emperor's visit to the city.
 A time capsule with documents related to the National Museum of Brazil was buried near the institution in 2022 to be opened 50 years later.

Canada 
On July 26, 1830, a formal procession and ceremony took place to deposit coins and bottled newspapers into a carved hollow of the cornerstone of the new courthouse building at Harbor Grace, NL. Witnessed by more than 1000 residents and dignitaries, several symbolic items (corn, oil, wine) were poured over the stone. The Harbour Grace Court House is the oldest surviving public building in Newfoundland and one of the National Historic Sites of Canada.
The British Columbia Time Capsule in Victoria, British Columbia. Built near the Confederation Garden Court adjacent to the provincial Parliament buildings on December 31, 1967, it is set to be opened 100 years later as part of what will be Canada's bi-centennial celebrations.
 A geologist left a bottled message in 1959 in a cairn on Ward Hunt Island (83°N latitude), allowing its finders in 2013 to determine that a nearby glacier had retreated over 200 feet in 54 years.
 Inside the head of the World's Largest Axe in Nackawic, New Brunswick.
 6 Feet underground in the Chinook Centre in Calgary, Alberta; to be opened on December 31, 2999.
 1234 Main Street, Moncton, New Brunswick
 Inside Joseph Salter memorial,  Main Street, Moncton, New Brunswick
 Inside the CN Tower, in Toronto, Ontario. To be opened at the 100th anniversary in 2076.

Chile
 A privately funded time capsule, buried in front of the former city hall of Puerto Montt in October 2010, to be opened by February 2053.
 The Cápsula Bicentenario (Bicentennial Capsule), a publicly funded capsule created to commemorate the 200th anniversary of Chile, was buried on September 29, 2010 at the Plaza de Armas in Santiago. It is set to be opened in September 18, 2110.

France 
 Normandy American Cemetery and Memorial.
 Strasbourg Cathedral.
 Le Lieu unique.

Iceland 
Erected in 2014, the monument is located in Reykjavik, Iceland, has of three differently shaped 15 feet tall spires, two made of stone and one metal center pillar.

India
 Indian Prime Minister Indira Gandhi had buried a time capsule outside one of the gate of Red Fort complex,The Indira Gandhi government named this time capsule "Kalpaatra", Delhi containing post-independence history of India on August 15, 1972 amid political opposition. It was scheduled to be opened after 1000 years. The next Janata government unearthed it in 1977 but its contents were never made public and were lost.
 A time capsule was buried in the presence of the President of India near the auditorium of IIT Kanpur on March 6, 2010.
 Mahatma Mandir, Gandhinagar containing the history of Indian state of Gujarat marking the 50 years of its foundation. Installed in 2010.
 Alexandra Girls' English Institution, a school in Fort, South Mumbai buried a time capsule in 2014, scheduling it to be opened on September 1, 2062, on the bi-centennial anniversary of the school.
 Under the flag holding of Prime Minister Narendra Modi, a time-capsule was buried in the premises of Lovely Professional University, a University located in Jalandhar, Punjab on the second day of Indian National Congress dated January 4, 2019. The occasion was attended by Nobel laureates, including biochemist Avram Hershko and physicist Duncan Haldane. They lowered a 8x8 time capsule-box made of aluminium and wood with a glass door. 10 feet into the ground. A smart phone, landline telephone, VCR, stereo player, stop watch, computer parts like hard disk, mouse, laptop, central processing unit, a motherboard, hard disk with the latest documentaries and movies, a camera, science-text books and scientific equipment like rheostat, refrectorscope and double microscope are some of the things that will remain buried for 100 years. The area where the capsule has been buried would be cemented and earmarked.
 On January 26, 2021, a 1.5 tonne time capsule encapsulating the history of Aligarh Muslim University (AMU) history spanning over a century was buried 30 feet deep in the park opposite Victoria Gate during Republic Day celebrations to mark the university's eventful centenary year on Tuesday.

Indonesia

 On 1 June 1976, as the construction of Hayam Wuruk Building (Wisma Hayam Wuruk) in Central Jakarta, Jakarta finished, a time capsule was buried into one of the building's structure. The capsule contains polaroid pictures of the capsule burying ceremony, some coins, and daily newspapers in Jakarta published on that date. The opening date, however, remains unknown.

 At the start of the construction of the Matahari Tower in Lippo Karawaci, Tangerang Regency, Banten in 1994, a time capsule was embedded. It is not known where it was located, what was in it and when it will be opened.

 To commemorate 70th anniversary of Indonesian independence, a time capsule was buried in a square of Merauke town, Merauke Regency, South Papua in 2015, near Mopah International Airport. Inside the capsule are "the dreams and hopes" of Indonesian children for the next 70 years, planned to be opened in 2085. Merauke Time Capsule Monument is built upon the buried capsule, it was inaugurated on November 16, 2018.

Italy 
 A ~20-man, White War military barracks on Mount Scorluzzo—which had been locked up at the end of World War I—became partly accessible from the 1990s and completely accessible in 2015 because of melting glaciers. The barracks contained beds made of straw, clothes, lanterns, newspapers, postcards, coins, tinned food and animal bones empty of marrow.

Japan 
 The Expo '70 time capsule is located near Osaka Castle, donated by Panasonic and the Mainichi Newspapers. It was opened for the first time in 2000, and then the second time expected to be opened in 2100. The time capsule remains sealed until 6970.

Kazakhstan 
 In Aktau, people of 1967 sent a message showing the chronology of the development of Mangyshlak Peninsula with the names of the people who helped to build the town in the desert. The letter was put in a metallic cylinder in a triangular marble urn. It opened in November 2017.

Kuwait 
 In 2019, a time capsule was commissioned by Kuwait Institute for Scientific Research to observe the grand opening of the Shagaya Renewable Energy Park. It is scheduled to be opened in 2061 when the State of Kuwait celebrates its centenary.
 On December 15, 2013, a time capsule was buried in the garden of the English School, Kuwait to commemorate the school's 60th anniversary. It is to be opened in 2073.

Malaysia
 Rotary Club Time Capsule Monument (GPS: 3.15912, 101.69825) is a commemorative monument along Jalan Sultan Ismail in Kuala Lumpur. It was originally located at Dataran Merdeka, but was relocated to Jalan Sultan Ismail around 2016. It comprises a stainless steel column topped with a Rotary International logo. At the base is a black marble-encased pedestal under which a time capsule is buried. The monument was erected to celebrate the presence of Rotary in Malaysia since 1929. It was officiated by the mayor of Kuala Lumpur, Tan Sri Dato' Kamaruzzaman bin Shariff, on June 26, 2000.

Norway
 On September 17, 2017 near the Polish Polar Station, Hornsund in the Norwegian Svalbard archipelago, scientific researchers buried a 60-centimeter stainless steel tube containing samples designed to tell finders as long as half a million years into the future, about the current state of knowledge in such areas as geology, biology, and technology.

Philippines 
 The El Hogar Building in Escolta, Manila contained a time capsule behind a copper plaque and is believed to contain mostly Spanish-language works. It was reportedly removed from the building in 2018.
 Three time capsules were sealed near the town hall of Naguilian, La Union containing memoribilia related to the town's history and culture. These are to be opened after 25, 50, and 100 years.

Poland 
 Prisoners from the Auschwitz concentration camp concealed bottles containing sketches and writings that were found after World War II.
In 2016, a copper-cylinder time capsule dating to 1934 was found beneath the former Nazi training facility in the Ordensburg Krössinsee building in Złocieniec, Poland. The time capsule, which contained photographs, newspapers, coins, and two copies of Hitler's Mein Kampf, was retrieved by researchers who navigated through thick concrete, German mines, and groundwater.

Russia 
 In 2012, a time capsule dating from July 15, 1979 was found in Vulkanny (Yelizovsky District, Kamchatka peninsula) under a statue of Lenin. It contained messages to the "soviet Russian master society in 2024."

Singapore 
 The oldest known time capsule in Singapore was rediscovered in early 2016, beneath the foundation stone of the Cathedral of the Good Shepherd. The shoebox-sized time capsule from June 18, 1843 was found to include a prayer booklet and newspapers, and international coins. The capsule is thought to have been buried by French Catholic missionary priests and other founding communities of Singapore.
 On April 1, 1937, a capsule containing coins and newspapers from the time was buried under the foundation stone of the former Supreme Court building with the intention that it be opened in the year 3000. The building now houses the National Gallery Singapore, where the foundation stone can still be seen today.
 In 1949, a capsule was buried at Anglo-Chinese School (Barker Road) containing school magazines, a bible and records of major donors. Thought to be lost, the capsule was rediscovered in 2000 with the help of a former student who had attended the burial ceremony.
 A capsule buried in 1950 under the then Royal Island Club (now the Singapore Island Country Club) was thought to be lost but later found by construction workers in 2010. It contained photographs and newspapers.
 In 1970, one of Singapore's founding leaders, Dr Goh Keng Swee laid a copper cylinder containing newspapers and Singapore bank notes from the era, somewhere in the former National Stadium. Unfortunately the location has been lost and metal detectors have failed to find it despite a $50,000 reward on offer.
 Since 1973, Science Centre Singapore has been depositing gadgets and examples of significant technologies in a time capsule inaugurated by then Science and Technology Minister Dr Toh Chin Chye. The first 112 items deposited included a black and white television receiver, a camera and samples of pig feed. After additional deposits were made in 1983, 2001 and 2013, the original capsule was replaced with a larger stainless steel container that now holds over 800 items in an atmosphere of inert nitrogen gas in the hope that this will better preserve the artefacts inside.
 The Jurong Town Corporation buried a time capsule under Jurong Town Hall in 1974. When opened in 2001, the capsule was found to contain reports, articles and photographs illustrating the industrialisation of Jurong.
 In 1975, part of Singapore's contribution to an International Ocean Exposition held in Okinawa, Japan entitled The Sea We Would Like to See was a research project using floating time capsules. The previous year, 50 small round capsules were released from Raffles Lighthouse as part of a global fleet of 2,800 to measure oceanic tides and currents. Each capsule contained information about the Exposition, a goodwill message from a Japanese child and a voucher for a Citizen Blackie watch to incentivise finders to fill in a post card with details of where the capsule were found. 24 of the capsules released in Singapore were later recovered.
 1990 saw the unexpected unearthing of a time capsule from the 1950s by contractors working at the demolished American Insurance building in Robinson Road. Buried on 26 April 1956, the copper canister contained English and Chinese newspapers, a financial report, photographs, posters and an insurance agent's manual.
 In 2015, a time capsule buried to celebrate Singapore's 25th year of independence was dug up and replaced with one celebrating 50 years as a sovereign nation. The original canister held 88 "symbols of progress" including a video tape of the 1966 National Day (Singapore), water from the Singapore River and the first sarong kebaya uniforms designed by Pierre Balmain for Singapore Airlines in 1968. The replacement capsule, made from stainless steel, was buried by then Deputy Prime Minister Ong Teng Cheong outside Empress Place.
 On 31 August 2005, Singapore Polytechnic buried a time capsule in order to conclude year-long celebrations of its 50th anniversary of its founding in 1954. Located near its main library, it is scheduled to be re-opened in 2029 for its 75th anniversary. Items in the time capsule included staff and student admission cards, a CD of 2004's graduation ceremony and a bottle of locally brewed red wine.

Spain 
 An 1834 time capsule was discovered in 2009 under a statue of Miguel de Cervantes in Madrid. It contains a guide and four volumes of the 1819 edition of Don Quixote.
 A time capsule was buried in Motril, Granada. It will be opened on July 22, 2023 to celebrate the 150th anniversary of the cantonal movement.
 A 1777 time capsule was discovered within a religious statue in Sotillo de la Ribera (Burgos). It contained two handwritten pages describing details of the political, religious, and economic situation of the region at the time.

South Korea 
 During the inaugural Youth Day event in 2020, K-pop group BTS handed a time capsule to president Moon Jae-in to be opened in the year 2039, during the 20th Youth Day event. It was currently stored in the National Museum of Korean Contemporary History. The purple time capsule contains some of the best memories BTS had during their entire career.
 The Seoul Millennium Time Capsule in Namsangol Hanok Village was buried in 1994 to celebrate Seoul's 600th anniversary as the capital of Korea. It contains 600 items chosen to represent the city. The time capsule is set to be opened on November 29, 2394, on the city's 1000th anniversary.

Tasmania
 "Earth's Black Box"—a city bus-sized structure with steel walls, battery storage and solar panels located at a remote site in Tasmania—will accumulate and electronically store comprehensive climate research and related data, including land and sea temperature changes, ocean acidification, atmospheric greenhouse gas concentrations, human population, energy consumption, military spending, and policy changes. The box was conceived to tell future civilizations how humankind created the climate crisis, and how it failed or succeeded to address it.

United Kingdom 
 Kingussie, Scotland: in August 2015, workers discovered a metal box containing a newspaper from September 29, 1894, a paper scroll and a bottle believed to contain whisky.
 Newton Aycliffe, County Durham, England: On March 21, 2017, a time capsule bearing the name of its creator, James D Robinson, was 'sealed' at an informal gathering in a local church hall. It was subsequently transferred to the nearby Durham County Record Office, at County Hall, in the City of Durham, where it will reside in their archive facility for the next 300 years. The capsule contains an eclectic mix of texts and images along with a number of artefacts, and is scheduled to be opened on 21 March 2317.
 The children's television show Blue Peter has buried several time capsules during its run. Ones buried in London in 1971 and 1984 were opened in January 2000. A third was then buried to be opened in 2029, and has since been relocated to Salford, Greater Manchester. One was also placed under the Millennium Dome in London in 1998, to be opened in 2050, but was accidentally unearthed and damaged during construction work in 2017. It was reburied once it was repaired.
 Southampton, Hampshire: a 1935 message in a lemonade bottle, correctly portending difficult times lying ahead, was found in 2016 by masons restoring damaged Portland stone at Southampton Guildhall.
Millennium Vault, Europe's largest time capsule was built in 2000 in Guildford, Surrey. The capsule, which contains lots of mementos, is set to be opened in 3000.

United States 
 Richmond, Virginia. A time capsule hidden since 1887 in a pedestal beneath a statue of Robert E. Lee was opened in December 2021 after the statue's removal, revealing an 1875 almanac, a waterlogged book of fiction, a British coin, a catalog, a letter and a photograph of a master stonemason who worked on the pedestal.
 Waynesboro, Virginia. Time capsule for Fishburne Military School to be opened in 2179, the school's 300th anniversary.
 Richmond, Indiana. Time capsule placed in cornerstone of YMCA in 1955.
 On 15 June 1957, as part of the celebration of the 50th anniversary of Oklahoma statehood, a 1957 Plymouth Belvedere car was sealed in an underground vault in Tulsa, to be unearthed 50 years later on 14 June 2007 during Oklahoma's centennial celebration. Several items were left in the car's trunk and glove compartment, such as a 5 US gallon can of gasoline intended to start the car, should gasoline not be the fuel of choice for motor vehicles in 2007. A contest also took place, in which the contestant who came the closest to guessing the city population in 2007, would then be awarded the car and $100 in a savings account.
 Time Capsule in Centralia, Pennsylvania was to be opened in 2016 but was opened in 2014 instead. Within the time capsule was about two feet of water destroying most paper artifacts in the capsule. A miner's helmet and a pair of bloomers signed by the men living in the city at the time are among artifacts that remained.
 Crypt of Civilization in Atlanta, Georgia to be opened in 8113
 Macon, Georgia. A time capsule is located above ground in front of the Grand Opera House. It was sealed as part of America's bicentennial celebrations of 1976, and it is to be opened on July 4, 2076.
 Westinghouse Time Capsules in New York City expects to open in 6939
 Helium Centennial Time Columns Monument in Amarillo,Texas; to be opened in 2068 and 2968, respectively.
 Disneyland 40th Anniversary Time Capsule in Anaheim, California; to open in July 2035
 Green-Wood Cemetery, Brooklyn, New York: a time capsule placed in a cornerstone in 1954 was found in January 2013
 Salt Lake City, 78 S. Main & 100 South: In 2012, a time capsule from November 25, 1959 containing predictions for the year 2000 was found in the outside wall of the former First Federal Savings Bank
 Fort Collins, Colorado: In January 2013, a time capsule dated 6 June 1907 was found in a cornerstone of the building at 140 Oak Street
 Merrick Park Time Capsule in Coral Gables, Florida
 A 100-year-old time capsule in the First Lutheran Church of Oklahoma City opened on 23 April 2013
 Detroit Century Box in Detroit, Michigan, containing 56 letters from prominent citizens, sealed at midnight on 31 December 1900 and opened on 31 December 2000
 In 1992, a time capsule was buried at Nickelodeon Studios containing items that kids considered important at that time. It was moved to the Nickelodeon Suites Resort Orlando in 2005 and later to the Nickelodeon Animation Studio in 2016, and will be opened in 2042.
 Time capsule in Coeur d'Alene, Idaho.
 Time capsule encased in cement at the entrance of the Miami Dade County Courthouse, 73 W. Flagler, St., Miami, Florida. To be opened on September 17, 2087.
 The Samuel Adams and Paul Revere Time Capsule was found under the Golden Dome of the Massachusetts State House in December 2014. It is believed to have been buried in 1795 by then-Governor Samuel Adams and Paul Revere, and contained newspapers, a commonwealth seal, colony records, coins, a silver plate, and copper medal. It was uncovered, then added to and replaced, in 1855. Being 219 years old, it is the oldest time capsule to be discovered in the United States.
 A glass time capsule buried at MIT in 1957 was accidentally unearthed during construction in 2015. Made to be opened in 2957, its condition was checked and then it was reburied.
 On 1 September 1975, a time capsule was buried at the intersection of 7th and Main in Louisville, Kentucky to be opened in 100 years.
 A time capsule was buried in 1984 by patrons of the nightclub Danceteria. Intended to be opened in 6984, it was instead uncovered by construction workers in 2017.
 In 1975, a time capsule with contents of that year, was buried in front of Brooks Academy in Harwich, Massachusetts. The time capsule is due to be opened 100 years from the burial date, in the capsule's centennial year of 2075.

 On 23 January 1991 a time capsule was placed in a sculpture at NASA Lewis (now Glenn) Research Center, celebrating the 50th anniversary of the Center's groundbreaking.  The capsule is scheduled to be opened on 23 January 2041.
 On 14 January 2000, Livermore, California buried two time capsules.
 Time capsule at St. Joseph School in Mendham, New Jersey.
 The largest time capsule in the world is located in Seward, Nebraska, containing over 5,000 items, one of which is a Chevy Vega. It opens in July 4, 2025.
 On 1 August 1969 Wayne Centennial Time Capsule was placed in Wayne, Michigan and is due to be opened on 1 August 2069. 
 On 3 September 2013 Perry Hall High School buried a time capsule on the occasion of the school's 50th anniversary. It is to be opened on 3 September 2063.
 In August 2018 Sea Pines Montessori Academy buried a time capsule on the occasion of the school's 50th anniversary. It is to be buried in Harbour Town on Hilton Head Island, South Carolina and opened in August 2068.
Boulder, Colorado: The courthouse plaza at Pearl Street Mall has two time capsules: one to be opened in 2075, the other in 2096.
Reno, Nevada: A time capsule was placed in cornerstone at the Reno Masonic Lodge in October 1872. It was opened on April 16, 2019. It contained more than 40 items, including a harmonica, a corkscrew, silver dollars minted in Carson City and San Francisco, a piece of wood from Sutter's Mill, and copies of several newspapers, including the Nevada State Journal, the Nevada Appeal, and the Territorial Enterprise.
Upon the construction of its offices and studios on August 18, 1969, television station WWNY-TV in Carthage-Watertown, New York sealed a time capsule into the cornerstone of the new building. The time capsule contained, among other items, a film from then-news director Bob Tompkins explaining the contents, a script of the same recording, a program log from the day the cornerstone was laid, and various pictures of downtown Watertown in 1969 (the city's centennial). There was no open date included. The capsule was opened during the 6 PM newscast on October 22, 2019 to celebrate the station's 65th anniversary.
On December 14, 1999, WBEN, a radio station in Buffalo, New York buried a time capsule named the Millennium Time Capsule on Niagara Square that's to be opened on January 1, 2100.  It uses a tombstone located on the McKinley Memorial as a marker.  It's located at N 42° 53.181 W 078° 52.716.
 In February 2012, cast members from Disney California Adventure buried souvenirs into the capsule, which will open come February 2037.
 On July 4, 1976 the 'Philadelphia Restaurant and Business Association' placed a time capsule to be opened on July 4, 2076, America's Tri-centennial. It is buried 24 feet deep below a sidewalk at 126 Chestnut St.

Uruguay 

 The Monument to Christopher Columbus in Durazno was designed in 1892, the 400th anniversary of Christopher Columbus's arrival in the Americas, and a spherical time capsule was placed on top of the monument. In 1992, the time capsule was opened, and the original artifacts were replaced with new objects to be retrieved in 2092.

In space 
 Apollo 11 goodwill messages, on the Moon
 Arch Mission 1.2 on the Tesla Roadster in solar orbit and the Lunar Library in the Beresheet moon lander.
 Arch Mission Lunar Library 2.0 on the Astrobotic Peregrine
 Immortality Drive, in the International Space Station
 Lunar Codex's Peregrine, Nova, and Polaris archives on the Peregrine, Nova-C, and Griffin lunar landers
 Plaque on LAGEOS-1
 Plaque on Pioneer 10 and Pioneer 11
 Rosetta disk prototype, on the Rosetta space probe
 Two Voyager Golden Records on board Voyager 1 and Voyager 2

In film 
 100 Years, a film shot and produced in 2015 with release scheduled for 18 November 2115. It is being kept in a high-tech safe behind bulletproof glass that will open automatically on the film's premiere.

In internet 
 Yahoo Time Capsule, open as Yahoo.com 20th anniversary

Projected 
 KEO
 Lansing Time Capsule

Timeline

Openings
Dates of opening of already opened capsules.

Scheduled openings
Scheduled opening dates for already installed capsules.

See also 
 Message in a bottle

References

External links 

 Ten most-wanted time capsules, Oglethorpe University
 Register of Time Capsules